Lucía Bulnes de Vergara (pen name, Ga'Verra; 1845 — 1932) was a Chilean writer who wrote newspaper articles and short stories. Born in Santiago, she was the daughter of Manuel Bulnes and  Enriqueta Pinto. Her father was President of Chile from 1841 to 1851; her maternal grandfather, Francisco Antonio Pinto held the same office in 1827 and 1828, as did her brother, Aníbal Pinto, from 1876 to 1881. She was educated in Santiago, and married Ruperto Vergara Rencoret (1835-1908) at an early age. Traveling extensively, she wrote articles and short stories in Familia and La Revista Azul, noting her observations and using the pen name of "Ga'Verra". Also a gifted hostess, she was also known for the tertulias which she founded circa 1880 at her home in Santiago on Monjitas Street.

References

1845 births
1932 deaths
Chilean women journalists
19th-century Chilean short story writers
Chilean women short story writers
19th-century Chilean women writers
Writers from Santiago
Organization founders
Women founders